Ilgar or ILGAR may refer to:

People
 Ilgar Gurbanov (born 1986), Azerbaijani footballer
 Ilgar Mamedov, Russian fencer
 Ilgar Mammadov, Azerbaijani politician

Other uses
Ion Layer Gas Reaction, a non-vacuum technique for thin film deposition
 The Ilgar language